South Dakota lies in both the Mountain Time Zone and the Central Time Zone. Mountain Time roughly contains the western half of the state, but not all of it. Rapid City is the largest city in the Mountain Time portion of the state. Central Time contains the eastern half of the state and roughly more of the state than the Mountain Time Zone and includes the state capital Pierre and the largest city, Sioux Falls.

IANA time zone database
The 2 zones for South Dakota as given by zone.tab of the IANA time zone database. Columns marked * are from the zone.tab.

References

See also
 Time in the United States

South Dakota
Geography of South Dakota